Sovereignty is an art exhibition at the 2022 Venice Biennale's American pavilion featuring works by American sculptor Simone Leigh.

Further reading 

 
 
 https://news.artnet.com/art-world/simone-leigh-us-pavilion-venice-2101999
 
 
 https://www.bostonglobe.com/2022/04/21/arts/venice-biennales-us-pavilion-simone-leigh-brings-buried-stories-world/
 

American contemporary art
April 2022 events in Italy
Sculpture exhibitions
Solo art exhibitions
59th Venice Biennale